Marian Vlada (born 8 December 1987) is a Romanian footballer who plays as a forward for SC Popești-Leordeni.

Honours
CS Afumați
Liga III: 2015–16
Liga IV – Ilfov County: 2010–11
Rapid București
Liga III: 2018–19
Liga IV – Bucharest: 2017–18
CSM Slatina
Liga III: 2019–20

References

External links

1987 births
Living people
Romanian footballers
Association football forwards
Footballers from Bucharest
Liga I players
Liga II players
Liga III players
FC Rapid București players
CS Afumați players
CSM Slatina footballers